Ann Elizabeth Packer MBE (born 8 March 1942) is an English former sprinter, hurdler and long jumper. She won a gold medal in the 800 metres and a silver in the 400 metres at the 1964 Summer Olympics.

Early life
In 1959 Packer won the English Schools 100 yards title. Next year she competed internationally in the long jump. She attended Didcot Girls' Grammar School (now Didcot Girls' School).

Career
In 1962, she reached the finals in the 200 metres at the European Championships and in the 80 metres hurdles at the Commonwealth Games; she was also part of the 4 × 110 yards relay team that won two medals at these competitions. In 1963 she focused on the 400 metres, and already by her fourth 400m race ran a world-level time of 53.6 seconds.

When she was selected for the 1964 British Olympic team Packer worked as a physical education teacher at Coombe County Girls' School, New Malden, Surrey. At the Olympics she shared a room with long jump gold medallist Mary Rand. Packer was hoping to win the 400 metres, but was beaten into second place by Betty Cuthbert of Australia, despite setting a new European record at 52.20 seconds. Disappointed, Packer planned to skip the 800m event and have a shopping trip instead, until her fiancé, Robbie Brightwell persuaded her to compete. Before the Olympics, Packer only had five domestic 800m races; she had taken up a longer distance to improve her stamina, and earned the third British spot at the last minute.

In her heat and semi-final Packer finished fifth and third, running 2:12.6 and 2:06.0 respectively, being beaten by French runner Maryvonne Dupureur, clocking 2:04.5 and 2:04.1. She thus started the final the second slowest of the eight contestants, having raced at the distance only seven times before. Packer was sixth at 400 m, lying behind Dupureur. She began her sprint to the finish with about 150 m to go, moved up to third at 100 m and took the lead in the final straight, using her sprinting speed to take the gold. She broke the world record with a time of 2:01.1 minutes. Commenting on her win, Packer said "Middle-distance running for women was still in its infancy and the 800 m had only been run in Rome four years earlier for the first time. I knew nothing about the event but being so naive was probably to my advantage; it meant I did not have any limitations in my head regarding what I should or could do. Ignorance proved to be bliss." Packer's winning performance is featured in Tokyo Olympiad, the official documentary of the games directed by Kon Ichikawa.

After winning the gold medal, she announced her retirement at the age of 22 and so had one of the shortest athletics careers of any Olympic gold medallist. It would be another forty years before another British woman, Kelly Holmes, would win the 800 m, despite British men being successful at the distance.

Later in the same Games, Robbie Brightwell won a silver medal in the 4 × 400 m relay. They later married and had three sons, Gary, a 400 m runner like his mother, and Ian and David, the latter two becoming footballers with Manchester City. She and Brightwell were each appointed Member of the Order of the British Empire (MBE) in the 1965 New Year Honours for services to athletics. In 2011 Brightwell published a book detailing their careers: Robbie Brightwell and his Golden Girl: The Posh and Becks of Yesteryear. Packer now lives in Congleton in Cheshire.

In 2009, Packer was inducted into the England Athletics Hall of Fame. Ann was coached by Denis Watts and was a member of Reading Athletic Club when she was selected for the British Olympic team.

In 1966 Packer appeared in an experiment for the BBC TV history programme, Chronicle to see how far geese could walk in a day. She was chosen because however far the geese went, she would still be with them at the end.

Packer's 800m gold medal win at the Tokyo 1964 Summer Olympics is dramatically captured in the stunning documentary film Tokyo Olympiad (1965) directed by Kon Ichikawa. The race (and Packer celebrating with friends and loved ones after winning) is shown in its entirety starting at minute 59:30 of the film.

Athletic personal bests: 100y 10.9 (1963), 10.8w (1960); 100m 11.7w, 12.0 (1960), 200m 23.7 (1964), 400m 52.20 (1964), 800m 2:01.1 (1964), 80mh 11.4 (1960), HJ 1.60 (1959), LJ 5.92 (1960), Pen 4294 (old tables) (1963).

References

External links

BBC Sport article
 SportingLife article on Anne Packer
Photo of Ann Packer (left) with Mary Rand
Tokyo Olympiad - film by Kon Ichikawa (Criterion Collection)

1942 births
Living people
Alumni of the University of Greenwich
British female sprinters
British female middle-distance runners
Athletes (track and field) at the 1962 British Empire and Commonwealth Games
Athletes (track and field) at the 1964 Summer Olympics
Commonwealth Games silver medallists for England
Commonwealth Games medallists in athletics
Members of the Order of the British Empire
Olympic athletes of Great Britain
English Olympic medallists
Olympic gold medallists for Great Britain
Olympic silver medallists for Great Britain
People from Congleton
People from Oxfordshire
World record setters in athletics (track and field)
European Athletics Championships medalists
Sportspeople from Cheshire
Medalists at the 1964 Summer Olympics
Olympic gold medalists in athletics (track and field)
Olympic silver medalists in athletics (track and field)
Olympic female sprinters
Medallists at the 1962 British Empire and Commonwealth Games